The 2023 Fanatec GT World Challenge America Powered by AWS will be the seventeenth season of the United States Auto Club's GT World Challenge America, and the sixth under ownership of SRO Motorsports Group.

The season will begin at Sonoma on March 30, and end at Indianapolis on October 8.

Calendar
The preliminary calendar was released on July 29, 2022, featuring 14 races across seven rounds. In September, an updated schedule was released, postponing the event at Circuit of the Americas by two weeks and bringing the Road America round forward one week. An additional change was announced on October 17, moving the NOLA round from February 24–26 to April 28–30 to alleviate a clash with the Kyalami 9 Hours, as well as allowing the 2023 BoP test to be completed before the start of the season.

Entry list

Race results
Bold indicates overall winner

See also
 2023 GT World Challenge Europe
 2023 GT World Challenge Europe Endurance Cup
 2023 GT World Challenge Europe Sprint Cup
 2023 GT World Challenge Asia
 2023 GT World Challenge Australia

References

External links

GT World Challenge America
GT World Challenge America